This is a list of all listed buildings in Frindsbury and Frindsbury Extra excluding the Upnors.

References
Citations

Bibliography

 
 
  

Lists of listed buildings in Kent